Bematistes alcinoe, the alcinoe bematistes, is a butterfly in the family Nymphalidae. It is found in Guinea-Bissau, Guinea, Sierra Leone, Liberia, Ivory Coast, Ghana, Togo, Nigeria, Cameroon, Equatorial Guinea, São Tomé and Príncipe, the Democratic Republic of the Congo, Ethiopia, Uganda, Kenya, Burundi and Tanzania.

Description

P. alcinoe differs from the two preceding species [  macaria  and macarioides (pars) ] in having spots 1 b and 2 of the transverse band 
of the forewing distally rounded or cut off transversely, occasionally in the female with a narrow fissure between them; the transverse band of the forewing covers the extreme tip of the lower angle of the cell and also in the  female usually the base of cellule 3; in the male the basal part of cellules 1 a and 1 b of the forewing above is brown-yellow and this colour shades into the transverse band without any dividing-line; in the female the median band of the hindwing is white and sharply defined. -alcinoe Fldr. (= godmani Btlr.) (57 f). The dark marginal band on the upperside of the hindwing is narrower, about 6 mm. in breadth, and less sharply defined proximally; in the male the cell of the forewing is entirely or for the most part yellow-brown. Sierra Leone to Gold Coast. - camerunica Auriv. (= salvini Btlr.) (58 e, f) has the dark marginal band on the upperside of the hindwing in both sexes broader, 9-11mm. in breadth, and more sharply defined proximally; in the male the cell of the fore wing above is entirely or for the most part black. - Larva unicolorous dark red with black spines and black head. Pupa light-coloured with black markings and on the upperside of the abdomen on  each segment from 2-5 with a pair of very long, slender, black spines with yellow-red base and the tips  curved into hooks; those of the second segment are longer than the rest and directed forwards, those of the fifth segment the shortest; the head with two divaricating horns. Sjostedt bred this form in numbers in the Cameroons and thus the identity of the sexes at least here has been definitely established; the specimens show only quite unimportant variations inter se. Niger to the southern Congo region.

Subspecies
Bematistes alcinoe alcinoe (Guinea-Bissau, Guinea, Sierra Leone, Liberia, Ivory Coast, Ghana, Togo, Nigeria)
Bematistes alcinoe camerunica  (Aurivillius, 1893) (Cameroon, Bioko, Democratic Republic of the Congo, Uganda, Kenya, Burundi, north-western Tanzania)
Bematistes alcinoe nado  (Ungemach, 1932) (south-western Ethiopia)
Bematistes alcinoe racaji  Pyrcz, 1991 (island of Príncipe)

Biology
The habitat consists of forests.

The larvae feed on Adenia cisampelloides.

Taxonomy
Pierre & Bernau, 2also Pierre & Bernaud, 2014

References

External links
Die Gross-Schmetterlinge der Erde 13: Die Afrikanischen Tagfalter. Plate XIII 57 f ssp. camerunica
Die Gross-Schmetterlinge der Erde 13: Die Afrikanischen Tagfalter. Plate XIII 58 e, f camerunica
Images representing Acraea alcinoe at Bold
Acraea alcinoe alcinoe at Pteron

Butterflies described in 1852
Acraeini
Butterflies of Africa
Taxa named by Gustav Weymer